Martin Johansson may refer to:

Martin Johansson (bandy) (born 1987), Swedish bandy player for Villa Lidköping BK
Martin Johansson (ice hockey, born 1975),  Swedish ice hockey defenceman for IF Björklöven
Martin Johansson (ice hockey, born 1977), Swedish ice hockey left winger for Jonstorps IF
Martin Johansson (ice hockey, born 1987), Swedish ice hockey player for Mora IK
Martin Johansson (orienteer, born 1964), bronze medalist at the world championships in 1991 and 1993
Martin Johansson (orienteer, born 1984), bronze medalist at the world championships in 2007 and 2008
Martin Johansson (bishop) (1837–1908), Swedish bishop
Martin Johansson (speed skater) (born 1973), Swedish speed skater
Martin Emanuel Johansson (1918–1999), Swedish chess player

See also
Martin Johansen (born 1972), Danish footballer